Johan Claesz van Loo (c.1585 – 1660), was a Dutch brewer, owning De Drie Leliën (The Three Lilies) in Haarlem, best known today for his portrait painted by Frans Hals.

Biography
He was painted twice by Hals in his capacity as member of the Haarlem schutterij, the first time as captain in the St. Adrian group in 1633, and the second time in 1639 as colonel of the St. Joris group.
According to Pieter Biesboer he married Margrietge Arisdr Akersloot (the sister of Outgert Ariss Akersloot), and they had several children who later also became brewers. Their daughter Risje (1604-1652) married Florens Pietersz van der Hoeff in 1624. His son-in-law Hoeff served with him in the civic guard and was also painted by Hals in a stance in which he is looking at his father-in-law. Their son Cornelis van Loo (1609-1673) married Dorothea Olycan in 1635. Their son Nicolaas married Aletta Hannemans, the widow of Dorothea's brother Jacob Pietersz Olycan, in 1641. Loo was a member of the Haarlem regency from 1618 until his death, and he was a representative to the Staten-Generaal during the years 1649–1652.

His portrait in the 1633 schutterstuk formed the inspiration for a self-portrait by William Merritt Chase in 1903.

References

1580s births
1660 deaths
Frans Hals
Businesspeople from Haarlem
Dutch businesspeople
Dutch brewers